Miuccia Bianchi Prada (born Maria Bianchi  on 10 May 1949) is an Italian billionaire fashion designer and businesswoman. She is the head designer of Prada and the founder of its subsidiary Miu Miu. As of October 2021, Forbes estimated her net worth at US$4.8 billion. In June 2021, Bloomberg estimated her net worth to be $6.62 billion, ranked 464th in the world.

The youngest granddaughter of Mario Prada, Miuccia Prada took over the family-owned luxury goods manufacturer in 1978. Since then, the company has acquired Jil Sander, Helmut Lang and shoemaker Church & Co. In 2002, Prada opened her own contemporary art museum.

In March 2013, Prada was named one of the fifty best dressed over-50s by Forbes. The magazine listed her as the 75th most powerful woman in the world in 2014, when she had an estimated net worth of $11.1 billion.

Early life and education
Born Maria Bianchi on 10 May 1949 in Milan, she took the name Miuccia Prada in the 1980s, after being adopted by an aunt. Her biological parents were Luigi Bianchi and Luisa Prada. She has two older siblings, Albert and Marina.

Prada attended Liceo Classico Berchet high school in Milan and graduated with a PhD in political science at the University of Milan.

Career

Early beginnings
Prada trained at the Teatro Piccolo to become a mime and performed for five years. She was a member of the Italian Communist Party and involved in the women's rights movement during the seventies in Milan.

Career at Prada
By the mid-Seventies, Prada entered into her family's business of manufacturing luxury leather bags, a company established by her grandfather in 1913. She initially oversaw the design of accessories. In 1978 she met her future husband and business partner, Patrizio Bertelli.

Prada's first successful handbag design was in 1985. It was a line of black, finely-woven nylon handbags. By 1989, she designed and introduced her first women's ready-to-wear collection. In 1995 she launched her first menswear line. The Miu Miu line was introduced in 1992 as a less expensive womenswear line inspired by her personal wardrobe. She named it after her own nickname, Miu Miu.

In 1994, Prada showed her collections in both New York and London fashion weeks. She had already been exhibiting at Milan fashion week. Bertelli, Prada's husband, is responsible for the commercial side of products and Prada's retail strategy. The design house has grown into a conglomerate that includes labels such as Helmut Lang, Jil Sander, and Azzedine Alaïa. The company has expanded into leather goods, shoes, fragrances, and apparel for both men and women.

As of 2014, Prada is the co-CEO of Prada, together with her husband.

In 2020, Prada presented her final collection as the brand's sole creative director; because of the Covid-19 pandemic, it was unveiled in a sequence of short films directed by artists including Martine Syms and Juergen Teller. She has since been sharing that responsibility with Raf Simons.

Other activities
In 2010, Prada designed costumes for the Verdi opera "Attila" at the New York City Metropolitan Opera House.

Business philosophy
Prada deliberately avoids merging high art with fashion, saying "Art is for expressing ideas and for expressing a vision. My job is to sell."

Recognition

Awards and honors

Exhibitions
Along with designer Elsa Schiaparelli, Prada was the subject of the 2012 exhibition, "Impossible Conversations" at the Metropolitan Museum of Art.

Controversy
In early 2014, Prada and Patrizio Bertelli were put under investigation as part of a tax avoidance probe by Milan prosecutors. By 2016, both paid more than 400 million euros ($429 million) to settle their tax positions.

Personal life
Prada is married to Patrizio Bertelli, a businessman. Their two sons were born in 1988 and 1990, the elder being rally driver Lorenzo Bertelli. The couple lives in the apartment where she was born.

Prada is a collector of contemporary art and owns several artworks by Young British Artists. She is friends with the artists Cindy Sherman and Francesco Vezzoli.

Over several years, Prada acted as a godmother to a Luna Rossa boat nine times.

Honour 
 : Knight Grand Cross of the Order of Merit of the Italian Republic (21 December 2015)

References

External links

Women in Fashion biography from Time magazine
Miuccia Bianchi Prada
Miuccia Prada biography

1949 births
Living people
Fashion designers from Milan
21st-century Italian businesswomen
21st-century Italian businesspeople
Italian women fashion designers
Female billionaires
Italian art collectors
Women art collectors
Italian billionaires
Italian communists
Italian women's rights activists
Italian mimes
University of Milan alumni
Prada
20th-century Italian businesswomen
20th-century Italian businesspeople
Knights Grand Cross of the Order of Merit of the Italian Republic